A Running Jump is a 2012 short film written and directed by Mike Leigh. It was commissioned for the London 2012 Cultural Olympiad and shown on both Channel 4 on Monday 23 July and BBC Two on Thursday 26 July 2012. Leigh describes it as "a film reflecting on sport in everyday life – not to mention taxis and dodgy second-hand cars."

Cast
Eddie Marsan as Perry
Samantha Spiro as Debbie
Sam Kelly as Grandad
Danielle Bird as Jody
Nichole Bird as Hayley
Lee Ingleby as Gary
Robert Putt as Derek
Jade Anouka as Jody's friend
Belinda Everett as Karate girl
Selina Zaza as Karate girl
Ben Batt as Footballer
Jonny Leigh-Wright as Footballer

References

British short films